Michael Mak (born 16 August 1958) is a Hong Kong film director who is known for directing Dragon Force, Everlasting Love and Island of Greed . Michael born In Hong Kong and his ancestral hometown is Mowming city( 茂名市），Guangdong province.

Background
He is the brother of film producer Johnny Mak. He was born in 1958 in Hong Kong.

Career

1980s
Mak had an acting role in the 1984 film, Behind the Yellow Line.

He directed the 1984 film Everlasting Love which starred Irene Wan and Lau Tak Wah.

1990s to 2000s
The period action film Butterfly and Sword was released in 2003. It starred Michelle Yeoh as Sister Ko and Tony Leung as Sen who were trying to stop a revolutionary plot to overthrow the government.
He directed the 1997 gangster epic, Island of Greed which was produced by his brother Johnny. Under his direction, he portrayed Tawain as a Chinese version of Sicily where the politicians and triads were colluding together in an arrangement beneficial to both.

He directed the made-for-television film, Asian Charlie's Angels which was released in 2001. The film starred Christy Chung, Annie Wu and Kelly Lin.

Mak got to act again in the film in Kant Leung's Roaring Dragon, Bluffing Tiger which was released in 2003.

Filmography (selective)

References

External links
 Imdb: Michael Mak

Living people
1985 births
Hong Kong film directors